Saint Rose Township is one of fifteen townships in Clinton County, Illinois, USA.  As of the 2010 census, its population was 1,422 and it contained 543 housing units.

Geography

Demographics

Political districts
 Illinois's 19th congressional district
 State House District 102
 State Senate District 51

References
 
 United States Census Bureau 2007 TIGER/Line Shapefiles
 United States National Atlas

External links
 City-Data.com
 Illinois State Archives

Townships in Clinton County, Illinois
Townships in Illinois